Josephine Richardson (28 August 1923 – 1 February 1994) was a British Labour Party politician. At the time of her death she was Member of Parliament for Barking, a post she had held almost exactly 20 years, since 1974.

Early life
She was born in Newcastle upon Tyne, and attended Southend High School for Girls. Her father, a sales representative, had stood as a Liberal Party candidate in Darlington during the 1930s; he died while she was still young. Her mother was a member of the Congregational Church.

Despite her intellect, Richardson was unable to afford a university education, which she regretted throughout her life.

Parliamentary career
Having joined the Labour Party in 1945, she began her political career as Ian Mikardo's secretary. Richardson co-ordinated the Keep Left Group within the party, and went on to become the secretary of the Tribune Group before co-ordinating the Victory for Socialism Campaign. In 1951 she was elected to Hornsey Borough Council and became Mikardo's full-time secretary and working partner in his business, which involved trade with eastern Europe. She contested the parliamentary seats of Monmouth in 1951 and 1955, Hornchurch in 1959, and Harrow East in 1964.

She was elected Member of Parliament for Barking at the February 1974 election, and held the seat until her death at the age of 70 in 1994.

She was seen as a peace campaigner on the hard left of the Labour Party. She was a member of the Socialist Campaign Group, but resigned in 1988 in protest at Tony Benn's decision to challenge Neil Kinnock for the leadership. Richardson also served as a member of the Shadow Cabinet. She was a central figure of the feminist left, helped to expand women's rights in Britain, and was the head of a group of women MPs that supported the anti-pornography position. She was also a pro-choice campaigner.

Richardson also served as an executive member of the National Council for Civil Liberties during a time in which the Paedophile Information Exchange (PIE), a pro-paedophile activist group, was affiliated with it. She wrote to PIE journal Childhood Rights, saying that she supported that organisation's campaign against corporal punishment.

She co-authored the pamphlet Keeping Left (1950) with Richard Crossman, Michael Foot and Ian Mikardo.

In 1985, KGB defector Oleg Gordievsky named Richardson and two other left-wing Labour MPs as confidential contacts of his embassy.

Recognition
Jo Richardson Community School, in the London Borough of Barking and Dagenham, was named in her honour.

References

External links
 
 The Independent obituary
 They Work For You

1923 births
1994 deaths
Labour Party (UK) MPs for English constituencies
Female members of the Parliament of the United Kingdom for English constituencies
UK MPs 1974
UK MPs 1974–1979
UK MPs 1979–1983
UK MPs 1983–1987
UK MPs 1987–1992
UK MPs 1992–1997
Politicians from Newcastle upon Tyne
People from Southend-on-Sea
People educated at Southend High School for Girls
National Council for Civil Liberties people
Chairs of the Labour Party (UK)
20th-century British women politicians
British feminists
English socialist feminists